Doyle is a hamlet in the town of Cheektowaga in Erie County, New York, United States. The southern half is part of the Kaisertown neighborhood, which includes portions of Cheektowaga, West Seneca, and South Buffalo.

References

Hamlets in New York (state)
Hamlets in Erie County, New York